The 2016 Oklahoma State Cowboys football team represented Oklahoma State University in the 2016 NCAA Division I FBS football season. The Cowboys were led by 12th-year head coach Mike Gundy and played their home games at Boone Pickens Stadium in Stillwater, Oklahoma. They competed as members of the Big 12 Conference.

Schedule

Schedule Source:

Game summaries

Southeastern Louisiana

Central Michigan

Pittsburgh

at Baylor

Texas

Iowa State

at Kansas

West Virginia

at Kansas State

Texas Tech

at TCU

at Oklahoma

Colorado–Alamo Bowl

Rankings

References

Oklahoma State
Oklahoma State Cowboys football seasons
Alamo Bowl champion seasons
Oklahoma State Cowboys football